Theodore Marcus "Teddy" Edwards (April 26, 1924 – April 20, 2003) was an American jazz tenor saxophonist.

Biography
Edwards was born in Jackson, Mississippi, United States. He learned to play at a very early age, first on alto saxophone and then clarinet.

His uncle sent for him to come to Detroit to live because he felt opportunities were better. Due to illness in the family, he went back to Jackson and ventured to Alexandria, Louisiana. He was persuaded by Ernie Fields to join his band after going to Tampa, Florida. Edwards had planned to go to New York City, but Fields convinced him he could get there by way of Washington, D.C., if he worked with his band. Edwards ended up at the "Club Alabam" on Central Avenue in Los Angeles, which later became his city of residence.

Edwards played with many jazz musicians, including his personal friend Charlie Parker, Roy Milton, Wynonie Harris, Vince Guaraldi, Joe Castro and Ernie Andrews. A 1947 recording with Dexter Gordon, The Duel, was an early challenge to another saxophonist an approach he maintained whenever possible, including a recording with Houston Person. One such duel took place in the 1980s at London's 100 Club with British tenor Dick Morrissey. In 1964, Edwards played with Benny Goodman at Disneyland, and at the 1964 New York World's Fair.

Edwards performed and recorded with Tom Waits. He toured with him on the Heart Attack and Vine tour, and played to a packed Victoria Apollo in London with Waits and a bassist (the drummer had apparently been left behind after some dispute). The 1991 album, Mississippi Lad, featured two tracks with Waits, and Waits covers the Edwards-written ballad "Little Man" on his Orphans: Brawlers, Bawlers & Bastards collection.

He died in Los Angeles of prostate cancer, with which he had been diagnosed in 1994, at the age of 78.

Discography

As leader/co-leader
1947 The Foremost! – with Dexter Gordon (Onyx #201; shared various artists LP with Leo Parker and Wardell Gray)
1948 Central Avenue Breakdown, Vol. 1 (Onyx #212; shared various artists LP with Vivien Garry/Arv Garrison and Dodo Marmarosa)
1949 Central Avenue Breakdown, Vol. 2 (Onyx #215; shared various artists LP with Barney Kessel and Slim Gaillard)
1958 Sonny Rollins at Music Inn/Teddy Edwards at Falcon's Lair (Metrojazz) with Joe Castro - split album featuring Sonny Rollins tracks
1959 It's About Time (Pacific Jazz) with Les McCann
1960 Sunset Eyes (Pacific Jazz; reissued on Blue Note)
1960 Teddy's Ready! (Contemporary)
1960 Back to Avalon (Contemporary)
1961 Together Again!!!! – with Howard McGhee (Contemporary)
1961 Good Gravy! (Contemporary)
1962 Heart & Soul (Contemporary)
1966 Nothin' But the Truth! (Prestige)
1967 It's All Right! (Prestige)
1974 Feelin's (Muse)
1976 The Inimitable Teddy Edwards (Xanadu)
1979 Young at Heart (Storyville) with Howard McGhee
1979 Wise in Time (Storyville) with Howard McGhee
1980 Out of This World (SteepleChase)
1981 Good Gravy [live] (Timeless)
1991 Mississippi Lad (Verve/Gitanes) featuring Tom Waits
1993 Blue Saxophone (Verve/Gitanes)
1994 La Villa: Live in Paris (Verve/Gitanes)
1994 Tango in Harlem (Verve/Gitanes) - released 1995
1994 Horn to Horn (Muse) with Houston Person - released 1996
1996 Close Encounters (HighNote) with Houston Person - released 1999
1997 Midnight Creeper (HighNote)
1999 Sunset Eyes 2000 (Laroo) with Saskia Laroo
2000 Ladies Man (HighNote)
2000 The Legend of Teddy Edwards (Cope) - soundtrack
2001 Smooth Sailing (HighNote) - released 2003

As sideman
With  Frank Butler
Wheelin' and Dealin' (Xanadu, 1978)
With Joe Castro
Groove Funk Soul (Atlantic, 1960)
With Sonny Criss
Sonny's Dream (Birth of the New Cool) (Prestige, 1968)
With Richard "Groove" Holmes
Get Up & Get It! – includes Pat Martino on guitar (Prestige, 1967)
Welcome Home (World Pacific, 1968)
With Milt Jackson
That's the Way It Is (Impulse!, 1969)
Just the Way It Had to Be (Impulse!, 1969)
Memphis Jackson (Impulse!, 1969)
With King Pleasure
Golden Days (HiFi Jazz, 1960; reissued on Original Jazz Classics)
With Hank Jones
Ain't Misbehavin' (Galaxy, 1978)
With Julie London
 Feeling Good (Liberty, 1965)
With Shelly Manne
My Son the Jazz Drummer! (Contemporary, 1962)
With Les McCann
Les McCann Sings (Pacific Jazz, 1961)
McCann/Wilson (Pacific Jazz, 1964) with the Gerald Wilson Orchestra
With Howard McGhee
West Coast 1945-1947 (Uptown, 2014)
With Freddie Redd
Everybody Loves a Winner (Milestone, 1990)
With Max Roach and Clifford Brown
Max Roach and Clifford Brown In Concert (Gene Norman Presents, 1954; reissued on GNP Crescendo)
With Jimmy Smith
Bluesmith (Verve, 1972)With Leroy VinnegarLeroy Walks! – includes Gerald Wilson on trumpet (Contemporary, 1958)
Leroy Walks Again!! (Contemporary, 1963)With Gerald Wilson'You Better Believe It! (Pacific Jazz, 1961)Moment of Truth (Pacific Jazz, 1962)Portraits (Pacific Jazz, 1964)
On Stage (Pacific Jazz, 1965)
Feelin' Kinda Blues (Pacific Jazz, 1965)
The Golden Sword (Pacific Jazz, 1966)

References

External links
Teddy Edwards at The A-1 Artists Agency.
Interview with Teddy Edwards

1924 births
2003 deaths
American jazz tenor saxophonists
American male saxophonists
Cool jazz saxophonists
West Coast jazz saxophonists
Hard bop saxophonists
Bebop saxophonists
Musicians from Jackson, Mississippi
Xanadu Records artists
Muse Records artists
HighNote Records artists
Blue Note Records artists
Antilles Records artists
Timeless Records artists
SteepleChase Records artists
Contemporary Records artists
20th-century American saxophonists
Jazz musicians from Mississippi
20th-century American male musicians
American male jazz musicians